Claudiu Ionescu (born 18 August 1984) is a Romanian former footballer who played as a striker for teams such as ARO Câmpulung, Dacia Mioveni or Politehnica Iași, among others.

Club career

CS Mioveni
Ionescu spent most of his career at CS Mioveni, making his debut in 2004 in Liga II. He played his first Liga I game on 2 September 2007, against Universitatea Cluj.

Politehnica Iaşi
In the middle of 2012, Ionescu joined newly promoted Politehnica Iaşi. He scored on his debut match against Oțelul Galați in a 1–2 defeat.

References

External links
 
 

1984 births
Living people
Sportspeople from Slatina, Romania
Romanian footballers
Association football forwards
FC Argeș Pitești players
Liga I players
Liga II players
CS Mioveni players
FC Internațional Curtea de Argeș players
FC Politehnica Iași (2010) players
CS Sportul Snagov players